Fritz Berger may refer to:

 (1916–2002), German painter
Fritz Berger (officer) (1900–1973), German naval officer
Fritz Berger (skier), Swiss para-alpine skier
Fritz Berger (percussionist) (1895–1963), Swiss drummer